Marydale is an unincorporated community in Clinton County, Illinois, United States.

References

Unincorporated communities in Clinton County, Illinois
Unincorporated communities in Illinois